Ingbirchworth is a village in the Metropolitan Borough of Barnsley in South Yorkshire, England. It is in the civil parish of Gunthwaite and Ingbirchworth and is on the boundary of Kirklees in West Yorkshire. At the 2001 Census, the parish had a population of 400, increasing to 460 at the 2011 Census, and now estimated to be around 600.

The village is notable for its reservoir, the eldest of the three situated in the area (the others being Royd Moor and Scout Dike). During extreme droughts in the summer the reservoir has been known to dry out to the extent that the old bridge over the original stream, Summer Ford Bridge, can be seen. Development is mostly laid out along two lines: older houses and farms along the former turnpike of Huddersfield Road (the A629) and newer housing estates along Wellthorne Lane. It has one pub, The Fountain Inn, which reopened in 2021 having been saved from demolition. There is an agricultural supplies and hardware shop on the edge of the village on Huddersfield Road.

The Grange is the oldest extant building in the village, dating to 1624. This and a number of other properties in the older part of the village are Grade II listed.

Recent changes
A former pub, The Rose And Crown, was demolished in 2006 and the site was redeveloped for housing. The Methodist church was sold in 2014 and has now been converted to dwellings. On 6 November 2015, a newly commissioned war memorial was dedicated on a site on Wellthorne Avenue. This is the first permanent memorial of its type in the village. There was formerly a village shop which closed in 2016. However, a handful of "honesty box" local producers have opened up in the last couple of years.

See also
Listed buildings in Gunthwaite and Ingbirchworth

References

External links

Villages in South Yorkshire
Geography of the Metropolitan Borough of Barnsley